Epicallima formosella is a species of gelechioid moth. It belongs to subfamily Oecophorinae of the concealer moth family (Oecophoridae). 

It is found in North America and Europe. The wingspan is 12–16 mm. Adults are on wing from June to August depending on the location.

The caterpillars feed on decaying wood, typically of poplars (Populus).

Junior synonyms of E. formosella are:
 Borkhausenia formosella (Denis & Schiffermüller, 1775)
 Dafa formosella (Denis & Schiffermüller, 1775)
 Tinea formosella Denis & Schiffermüller, 1775

Footnotes

References

  (1942): Eigenartige Geschmacksrichtungen bei Kleinschmetterlingsraupen ["Strange tastes among micromoth caterpillars"]. Zeitschrift des Wiener Entomologen-Vereins 27: 105-109 [in German]. PDF fulltext
  (2003): Markku Savela's Lepidoptera and some other life forms – Epicallima formosella. Version of 2003-DEC-29. Retrieved 2010-APR-28.

External links
Swedish Moths
Lepidoptera of Belgium

Oecophorinae
Moths of Europe
Moths described in 1775